Sanavirón is an extinct and unclassified language once spoken near the Salinas Grandes in Córdoba, Argentina. Loukotka (1968) classified it as a language isolate, but there is insufficient data to justify this according to Campbell (2012).

Vocabulary
Loukotka (1968) lists the following basic vocabulary items.

{| class="wikitable"
! gloss !! Sanaviron
|-
| water || para
|-
| sun || solo
|-
| earth || lasta
|-
| house || tolo
|}

References

Languages of Argentina
Unclassified languages of South America